The 2019 Notre Dame Fighting Irish women's soccer team represented the University of Notre Dame during the 2019 NCAA Division I women's soccer season. It was the 32nd season of the university fielding a program. The Fighting Irish were led by 2nd year head coach Nate Norman and played their games at Alumni Stadium.

The Fighting Irish finished the season 11–8–2, 4–4–2 in ACC play to finish in a tie for eighth place.  As the eight seed in the ACC Tournament, they lost to North Carolina in the Quarterfinals.  They received an at-large bid to the NCAA Tournament where they defeated Saint Louis in the first round, before losing to South Carolina in the Second Round.

Squad

Roster

Updated July 7, 2020

Team management

Source:

Schedule
Source 

|-
!colspan=6 style=";"| Non-Conference Regular Season
|-

|-
!colspan=6 style=""| ACC Regular Season

|-
!colspan=6 style=";"| ACC Tournament

|-
!colspan=6 style=";"| NCAA Tournament

Rankings

References

Notre Dame
Notre Dame Fighting Irish women's soccer seasons
2019 in sports in Indiana